Teddy Nakimuli (born 3 March 2003) is a Ugandan boxer. She participated in the 2022 Commonwealth Games in  Light Flyweight winning a bronze medal.

References 

Living people
Boxers at the 2022 Commonwealth Games
Commonwealth Games competitors for Uganda
2003 births
Commonwealth Games bronze medallists for Uganda
Commonwealth Games medallists in boxing
Medallists at the 2022 Commonwealth Games